The Olivier brothers, Aimé, René, and Marius, were the first people responsible for recognizing the commercial potential of a new invention : the bicycle.

The Olivier family was wealthy, owning a series of chemical plant in France based in Lyon. While students in Paris in 1864, they were among the first users of the new velocipede. In 1868, the Oliviers formed a partnership with Pierre Michaux to mass-produce bicycles.

All through the first bicycle craze, from 1867 to 1869, it was René Olivier who led both the Michaux company and the industry as a whole. Then several major problems developed. The cast-iron frames would sometimes fail catastrophically. The relationship between the brothers and Michaud also broke down. 

In 1869 René formed his own Compagnie Parisienne bicycle factory, however, the bicycle craze in France (and in the United States) ended that year. The bicycle's popularity continuing only in England, it was inventors and manufacturers there who contributed the next series of improvements to its development.

References
 

Cycle manufacturers of France
Place of birth missing